The Principles of Quantum Mechanics is an influential monograph on quantum mechanics written by Paul Dirac and first published by Oxford University Press in 1930.
Dirac gives an account of quantum mechanics by "demonstrating how to construct a completely new theoretical framework from scratch"; "problems were tackled top-down, by working on the great principles, with the details left to look after themselves". It leaves classical physics behind after the first chapter, presenting the subject with a logical structure. Its 82 sections contain 785 equations with no diagrams.

Dirac is credited with developing the subject "particularly in Cambridge and Göttingen between 1925–1927" (Farmelo).

History
The first and second editions of the book were published in 1930 and 1935.

In 1947 the third edition of the book was published, in which the chapter on quantum electrodynamics was rewritten particularly with the inclusion of electron-positron creation.

In the fourth edition, 1958, the same chapter was revised, adding new sections on interpretation and applications. Later a revised fourth edition appeared in 1967.

Beginning with the third edition (1947), the mathematical descriptions of quantum states and operators were changed to use the Bra–ket notation, introduced in 1939 and largely developed by Dirac himself.

Laurie Brown wrote an article describing the book's evolution through its different editions, and Helge Kragh surveyed reviews by physicists (including Heisenberg, Pauli, and others) from the time of Dirac's book's publication.

Contents
The principle of superposition  
Dynamical variables and observables
Representations
The quantum conditions
The equations of motion
Elementary applications
Perturbation theory
Collision problems
Systems containing several similar particles
Theory of radiation
Relativistic theory of the electron
Quantum electrodynamics

See also

 The Evolution of Physics (Einstein)
 The Feynman Lectures on Physics Vol. III (Feynman)
 The Physical Principles of the Quantum Theory (Heisenberg)
 Mathematical Foundations of Quantum Mechanics (von Neumann)

References

1930 non-fiction books
1930 in science
Monographs
Oxford University Press books
Paul Dirac
Physics textbooks
Quantum mechanics